The Brennabor Typ B “Juwel 6”   is a six-cylinder automobile introduced by the Brennabor company in 1929 as a successor to the des Brennabor Typ A.

The Juwel 6 was powered by a newly developed 6-cylinder side-valve engine of 2.46 litres, mounted ahead of the driver and delivering 45 hp at 3,200 rpm.  The larger 3.1-litre 55 hp engine first seen on the  Typs ASK / ALK, could be specified as an option.  Power was delivered to the rear wheels through a single plate dry clutch and a three-speed gear box controlled using a centrally positioned floor-mounted gear stick.

The car sat on a U-profile pressed steel chassis with rigid axles and semi-elliptical leaf springing.   It was offered only as a four-door sedan/saloon or soft/open topped sedan/saloon.  A two-door full cabriolet was also offered.   The mechanically linked foot brake operated directly on all four wheels, while the handbrake operated on the rear wheels.

As with the Typ A which it replaced, the Juwel 6 could be ordered with two lengths of chassis.   The standard version was 4050 mm long, while the longer version, known as the Juwel 6 Extra, was 4150 mm long.

The Juwel 6 was offered till 1932, by which time approximately 3,000 had been produced.   A front-wheel drive replacement had been identified in 1931, but for cost reasons this never passed beyond the prototype phase, though it may have provided inspiration for the Audi Front launched by a leading competitor two years later in 1933.   Brennabor’s own successors for the Juwel 6 appeared in the form of the Brennabors Typ E and Typ F, also in 1933; but it was short-lived, since 1933 was the year when the company finally withdrew from automobile production.

Technical data

Sources 
•	Oswald, Werner: Deutsche Autos 1920–1945, Motorbuch Verlag Stuttgart, 10. Auflage (1996), 

Brennabor vehicles